Statistics of Swiss Super League in the 1932–33 season.

Overview
It was contested by 16 teams, and Servette FC Genève won the championship.

Group 1

Table

Results

Group 2

Table

Results

Playoff

Table

Results 

|colspan="3" style="background-color:#D0D0D0" align=center|11 June 1933

|-
|colspan="3" style="background-color:#D0D0D0" align=center|18 June 1933

|-
|colspan="3" style="background-color:#D0D0D0" align=center|25 June 1933

Championship play-off 

|colspan="3" style="background-color:#D0D0D0" align=center|2 July 1933

Sources 
 Switzerland 1932-33 at RSSSF

Nationalliga seasons
Swiss
Swiss Football, 1932-33 In